Mediastud is a Norwegian student media corporation founded in 1987.

Mediastud is the publisher of:
 Under Dusken, Scandinavia's oldest student newspaper (published since 1914)
 Radio Revolt, Norway's first student radio (broadcasting since 1984, name changed from Studentradion in 2008)
 Student-TV, Scandinavia's oldest student television station (broadcasting since 1991)

Mediastud is organized as a privately held company, jointly owned by Studentersamfundet i Trondhjem and Studentsamskipnaden i Trondheim.

References 
 Mediastud's website.
 Norwegian Wikipedia article on Radio Revolt.

External links
Mediastud's website.
Under Dusken's website.
Radio Revolt's website.
Student-TV's website.

Mass media companies of Norway
Mass media companies established in 1987
1987 establishments in Norway